Dana Incorporated is an American supplier of axles, driveshafts, transmissions, and electrodynamic, thermal, sealing, and digital equipment for conventional, hybrid, and electric-powered vehicles. The company's products and services are aimed at the light vehicle, commercial vehicle, and off-highway equipment markets. Founded in 1904 and based in Maumee, Ohio, the company employs nearly 36,000 people in 33 countries.  In 2019, Dana generated sales of $8.6 billion. The company is included in the Fortune 500.

History

In 1904, Clarence W. Spicer, engineer, inventor, and founder of the company, began manufacturing universal joints in Plainfield, New Jersey.
 Also in 1904, the first C.W. Spicer "u-joints" were shipped to Corbin Motor Company in Connecticut.
 In 1905, Spicer Universal Joint Manufacturing Company was incorporated.
 In 1909, the company changed its name to Spicer Manufacturing Company.
 In 1910, Spicer relocated to South Plainfield, New Jersey.
 In 1914, Charles Dana joined the company.
 In 1922, Spicer was listed on the New York Stock Exchange.
 In 1925, Spicer expanded internationally taking a holding in licensee in England, Hardy, renamed Hardy Spicer.
 In 1946, Dana became president and treasurer, and the company was renamed the Dana Corporation. Spicer becomes the brand name for the company's driveline products.
 In 1963, Dana acquired the Perfect Circle Company.
 In 1972, Dana bought a 35% stake in Wolverhampton-based engineering company, Turner Manufacturing.  The remaining shares were acquired a few years later. 
 In 2006, Dana filed for bankruptcy.
 In 2007, Dana canceled 150 million shares of stock during their bankruptcy.
 In 2018, Dana announced that it was buying a majority stake in TM4 Inc., a company specialized in electric powertrains, for C$165 million (US$127 million).
 In 2019, Dana acquired privately held SME Group (Italy).
 In March 2019, Dana purchased Drive Systems segment of the Oerlikon Group, including the Graziano Trasmissioni and Fairfield brands and VOCIS, a wholly owned electronic controls business located in the UK.
In August 2019, Dana acquired Nordresa Motors, Inc.
In 2020, Dana started using 3D printers at its Advanced Manufacturing Center in Maumee, Ohio to manufacture face shield components for use during the coronavirus pandemic. 
In March 2021, Dana  acquired Pi Innovo from Plymouth, Michigan.

Products
Key products include axles, drive shafts, universal joints and sealing and thermal-management products.

Axles
Dana 25
Dana 28
Dana 30
Dana 35
Dana 44
Dana 50
Dana 53
Dana 60
Dana 70
Dana 80
Dana S 110

Suspension
 Twin Traction Beam

References

External links

Auto parts suppliers of the United States
Companies based in Toledo, Ohio
Lucas County, Ohio
Manufacturing companies based in Ohio
Companies listed on the New York Stock Exchange
1904 establishments in New Jersey
Manufacturing companies established in 1904
Companies that filed for Chapter 11 bankruptcy in 2006
Automotive transmission makers